Emma's War may refer to:

Emma's War (book), a book by Deborah Scroggins
Emma's War (film), a 1986 Australian film